Daryl Thomas Evans (born January 12, 1961) is a Canadian former professional ice hockey player. He played in the National Hockey League with the Los Angeles Kings, Washington Capitals, and Toronto Maple Leafs between 1982 and 1987. The rest of his career, which lasted from 1981 to 1991, was spent in the minor leagues. He is currently the radio colour commentator for the Los Angeles Kings.

Hockey career
As a youth, Evans played in the 1974 Quebec International Pee-Wee Hockey Tournament with a minor ice hockey team from Toronto.

Evans was born in Toronto, Ontario. Drafted in 1980 by the Los Angeles Kings, Evans also played six games for the Washington Capitals and two games for the Toronto Maple Leafs.

He scored the game winning goal in the 'Miracle on Manchester’, one of the most significant goals in LA Kings history.

Broadcasting career
Evans has been the radio colour commentator for the Los Angeles Kings since 1998, alongside play-by-play voice Nick Nickson.

Charity work
Evans participates in many charity events for the Kings and teaches sponsored adult hockey Clinics at Toyota Center. Evans is known to be an excellent skater, having built up his ability by skating without laces

Personal life
Evans resides in Redondo Beach, California and has two children.

Career statistics

Regular season and playoffs

References

External links
 
 Profile at hockeydraftcentral.com

1961 births
Living people
Binghamton Whalers players
Brantford Alexanders players
British Hockey League players
Canadian expatriate ice hockey players in England
Canadian expatriate ice hockey players in Italy
Canadian ice hockey forwards
Canadian people of Welsh descent
HC Gardena players
Los Angeles Kings announcers
Los Angeles Kings draft picks
Los Angeles Kings players
National Hockey League broadcasters
New Haven Nighthawks players
Newmarket Saints players
Niagara Falls Flyers players
Saginaw Gears players
Ice hockey people from Toronto
Toronto Maple Leafs players
Washington Capitals players
Whitley Warriors players